Gydo Pass is situated in the Western Cape, province of South Africa on the Regional road R303 (Western Cape) between Ceres and Citrusdal.

Be Aware

 Driving Skill level: last stretch towards Citrusdal requires advanced driving skills
 Road Condition:   Tarred surface, except for first 20/30 kilometres from the Citrusdal end which is not tarred, sweeping turns, no safety barrier
 Remarks: Some tourist traffic. Fossil finds in roadside debris.

Mountain passes of the Western Cape